There are about 550 known moth species of Yemen. The moths (mostly nocturnal) and butterflies (mostly diurnal) together make up the taxonomic order Lepidoptera.

This is a list of moth species which have been recorded in Yemen.

Alucitidae
Alucita nannodactyla (Rebel, 1907)

Arctiidae
Amatula kikiae Wiltshire, 1983
Creataloum arabicum (Hampson, 1896)
Creatonotos leucanioides Holland, 1893
Eilema sokotrensis (Hampson, 1900)
Nyctemera torbeni Wiltshire, 1983
Secusio strigata Walker, 1854
Siccia butvillai Ivinskis & Saldaitis, 2008
Spilosoma yemenensis (Hampson, 1916)
Utetheisa lotrix (Cramer, 1779)
Utetheisa pulchella (Linnaeus, 1758)

Autostichidae
Hesperesta arabica Gozmány, 2000
Turatia argillacea Gozmány, 2000
Turatia striatula Gozmány, 2000
Turatia yemenensis Derra, 2008

Choreutidae
Choreutis aegyptiaca (Zeller, 1867)

Coleophoridae
Ishnophanes bifucata Baldizzone, 1994
Coleophora aegyptiacae Walsingham, 1907
Coleophora eilatica Baldizzone, 1994
Coleophora himyarita Baldizzone, 2007
Coleophora jerusalemella Toll, 1942
Coleophora lasloella Baldizzone, 1982
Coleophora longiductella Baldizzone, 1989
Coleophora recula Baldizzone, 2007
Coleophora sabaea Baldizzone, 2007
Coleophora semicinerea Staudinger, 1859
Coleophora sudanella Rebel, 1916
Coleophora taizensis Baldizzone, 2007
Coleophora yemenita Baldizzone, 2007

Cosmopterigidae
Alloclita gambiella (Walsingham, 1891)

Cossidae
Aethalopteryx diksami Yakovlev & Saldaitis, 2010
Azygophleps larseni Yakovlev & Saldaitis, 2011
Azygophleps sheikh Yakovlev & Saldaitis, 2011
Meharia acuta Wiltshire, 1982
Meharia philbyi Bradley, 1952
Meharia hackeri Saldaitis, Ivinskis & Yakovlev, 2011
Meharia semilactea (Warren & Rothschild, 1905)
Meharia yakovlevi Saldaitis & Ivinskis, 2010
Mormogystia brandstetteri Saldaitis, Ivinskis & Yakovlev, 2011
Mormogystia proleuca (Hampson in Walsingham & Hampson, 1896)
Paropta frater Warnecke, 1930

Crambidae
Achyra nudalis (Hübner, 1796)
Amselia leucozonellus (Hampson, 1896)
Ancylolomia chrysographellus (Kollar, 1844)
Antigastra catalaunalis (Duponchel, 1833)
Aplectropus leucopis Hampson, 1896
Autocharis fessalis (Swinhoe, 1886)
Bocchoris inspersalis (Zeller, 1852)
Bocchoris onychinalis (Guenée, 1854)
Cotachena smaragdina (Butler, 1875)
Cybalomia albilinealis (Hampson, 1896)
Diaphana indica (Saunders, 1851)
Dolicharthria paediusalis (Walker, 1859)
Eoophyla peribocalis (Walker, 1859)
Euchromius ocellea (Haworth, 1811)
Euclasta varii Popescu-Gorj & Constantinescu, 1973
Heliothela ophideresana (Walker, 1863)
Hellula undalis (Fabricius, 1781)
Herpetogramma licarsisalis (Walker, 1859)
Hodebertia testalis (Fabricius, 1794)
Lamprosema inglorialis Hampson, 1918
Loxostege albifascialis (Hampson, 1896)
Metasia profanalis (Walker, 1865)
Noctuelia floralis (Hübner, [1809])
Nomophila noctuella ([Denis & Schiffermüller], 1775)
Noorda blitealis Walker, 1859
Palepicorsia ustrinalis (Christoph, 1877)
Palpita unionalis (Hübner, 1796)
Ptychopseustis pavonialis (Hampson, 1896)
Pyrausta arabica Butler, 1884
Spoladea recurvalis (Fabricius, 1775)
Synclera traducalis (Zeller, 1852)
Tegostoma bipartalis Hampson, 1896
Tegostoma comparalis (Hübner, 1796)
Thyridiphora furia (Swinhoe, 1884)

Galacticidae
Galactica inornata (Walsingham, 1900)
Homadaula maritima Mey, 2007
Homadaula montana Mey, 2007
Homadaula submontana Mey, 2007

Gelechiidae
Anarsia acaciae Walsingham, 1896
Parapsectris amseli (Povolny, 1981)
Phthorimaea molitor (Walsingham, 1896)
Sitotroga cerealella (Olivier, 1789)

Geometridae
Acidaliastis micra Hampson, 1896
Brachyglossina tibbuana Herbulot, 1965
Casilda kikiae (Wiltshire, 1982)
Charissa lequatrei (Herbulot, 1988)
Cleora rostella D. S. Fletcher, 1967
Cyclophora staudei Hausmann, 2006
Disclisioprocta natalata (Walker, 1862)
Eucrostes disparata Walker, 1861
Glossotrophia jacta (Swinhoe, 1884)
Idaea granulosa (Warren & Rothschild, 1905)
Idaea illustrior (Wiltshire, 1952)
Idaea tahamae Wiltshire, 1983
Idaea testacea Swinhoe, 1885
Isturgia catalaunaria (Guenée, 1858)
Isturgia disputaria (Guenée, 1858)
Isturgia sublimbata (Butler, 1885)
Neromia pulvereisparsa (Hampson, 1896)
Oar pratana (Fabricius, 1794)
Omphacodes directa (Walker, 1861)
Pseudosterrha rufistrigata (Hampson, 1896)
Scopula actuaria (Walker, 1861)
Scopula rufinubes (Warren, 1900)
Traminda mundissima (Walker, 1861)
Zamarada anacantha D. S. Fletcher, 1974
Zamarada latilimbata Rebel, 1948
Zamarada minimaria Swinhoe, 1895
Zamarada torrida D. S. Fletcher, 1974
Zygophyxia retracta Hausmann, 2006

Gracillariidae
Phyllocnistis citrella Stainton, 1856
Phyllonorycter aarviki de Prins, 2012
Phyllonorycter grewiella (Vári, 1961)
Phyllonorycter maererei de Prins, 2012
Phyllonorycter mida de Prins, 2012

Hyblaeidae
Hyblaea puera (Cramer, 1777)

Lasiocampidae
Braura desdemona Zolotuhin & Gurkovich, 2009
Odontocheilopteryx myxa Wallengren, 1860

Limacodidae
Parasa fulvicorpus Hampson, 1896

Lymantriidae
Euproctis erythrosticta (Hampson, 1910)
Knappetra fasciata (Walker, 1855)

Micronoctuidae
Micronola wadicola Amsel, 1935
Micronola yemeni Fibiger, 2011

Noctuidae
Acantholipes aurea Berio, 1966
Acantholipes canofusca Hacker & Saldaitis, 2010
Acantholipes circumdata (Walker, 1858)
Achaea catella Guenée, 1852
Achaea finita (Guenée, 1852)
Achaea lienardi (Boisduval, 1833)
Achaea mercatoria (Fabricius, 1775)
Acontia akbar Wiltshire, 1985
Acontia albarabica Wiltshire, 1994
Acontia antica Walker, 1862
Acontia basifera Walker, 1857
Acontia binominata (Butler, 1892)
Acontia chiaromontei Berio, 1936
Acontia crassivalva (Wiltshire, 1947)
Acontia dichroa (Hampson, 1914)
Acontia hoppei Hacker, Legrain & Fibiger, 2008
Acontia hortensis Swinhoe, 1884
Acontia imitatrix Wallengren, 1856
Acontia insocia (Walker, 1857)
Acontia karachiensis Swinhoe, 1889
Acontia lactea Hacker, Legrain & Fibiger, 2008
Acontia manakhana Hacker, Legrain & Fibiger, 2010
Acontia melaena (Hampson, 1899)
Acontia minuscula Hacker, Legrain & Fibiger, 2010
Acontia mukalla Hacker, Legrain & Fibiger, 2008
Acontia opalinoides Guenée, 1852
Acontia peksi Hacker, Legrain & Fibiger, 2008
Acontia philbyi Wiltshire, 1988
Acontia porphyrea (Butler, 1898)
Acontia transfigurata Wallengren, 1856
Acontia trimaculata Aurivillius, 1879
Acontia yemenensis (Hampson, 1918)
Aegocera bettsi Wiltshire, 1988
Aegocera brevivitta Hampson, 1901
Aegocera rectilinea Boisduval, 1836
Agoma trimenii (Felder, 1874)
Agrotis acronycta (Rebel, 1907)
Agrotis biconica Kollar, 1844
Agrotis brachypecten Hampson, 1899
Agrotis herzogi Rebel, 1911
Agrotis ipsilon (Hufnagel, 1766)
Agrotis medioatra Hampson, 1918
Agrotis segetum ([Denis & Schiffermüller], 1775)
Agrotis sesamioides (Rebel, 1907)
Aletia consanguis (Guenée, 1852)
Amefrontia purpurea Hampson, 1899
Amyna axis Guenée, 1852
Amyna delicata Wiltshire, 1994
Amyna punctum (Fabricius, 1794)
Anarta endemica Hacker & Saldaitis, 2010
Anarta trifolii (Hufnagel, 1766)
Androlymnia clavata Hampson, 1910
Anoba socotrensis Hampson, 1926
Anoba triangularis (Warnecke, 1938)
Anomis erosa (Hübner, 1818)
Anomis flava (Fabricius, 1775)
Anomis mesogona (Walker, 1857)
Anomis sabulifera (Guenée, 1852)
Antarchaea conicephala (Staudinger, 1870)
Antarchaea digramma (Walker, 1863)
Antarchaea erubescens (Bang-Haas, 1910)
Antarchaea flavissima Hacker & Saldaitis, 2010
Antarchaea fragilis (Butler, 1875)
Anticarsia rubricans (Boisduval, 1833)
Anumeta atrosignata Walker, 1858
Anumeta spilota (Erschoff, 1874)
Argyrogramma signata (Fabricius, 1775)
Asplenia melanodonta (Hampson, 1896)
Athetis partita (Walker, 1857)
Attatha metaleuca Hampson, 1913
Aucha polyphaenoides (Wiltshire, 1961)
Autoba abrupta (Walker, 1865)
Autoba admota (Felder & Rogenhofer, 1874)
Brevipecten bischofi Hacker & Fibiger, 2007
Brevipecten biscornuta Wiltshire, 1985
Brevipecten calimanii (Berio, 1939)
Brevipecten confluens Hampson, 1926
Brevipecten hypocornuta Hacker & Fibiger, 2007
Brevipecten marmoreata Hacker & Fibiger, 2007
Brevipecten tihamae Hacker & Fibiger, 2007
Brithys crini (Fabricius, 1775)
Callopistria latreillei (Duponchel, 1827)
Callopistria maillardi (Guenée, 1862)
Callopistria yerburii Butler, 1884
Callyna gaedei Hacker & Fibiger, 2006
Calophasia platyptera (Esper, [1788])
Caradrina soudanensis (Hampson, 1918)
Caranilla uvarovi (Wiltshire, 1949)
Carcharoda yemenicola Wiltshire, 1983
Catamecia minima (Swinhoe, 1889)
Cerocala sokotrensis Hampson, 1899
Chasmina vestae (Guenée, 1852)
Chrysodeixis acuta (Walker, [1858])
Chrysodeixis chalcites (Esper, 1789)
Clytie devia (Swinhoe, 1884)
Clytie infrequens (Swinhoe, 1884)
Clytie sancta (Staudinger, 1900)
Clytie tropicalis Rungs, 1975
Condica capensis (Guenée, 1852)
Condica conducta (Walker, 1857)
Condica illecta Walker, 1865
Condica pauperata (Walker, 1858)
Condica viscosa (Freyer, 1831)
Cortyta canescens Walker, 1858
Ctenoplusia dorfmeisteri (Felder & Rogenhofer, 1874)
Ctenoplusia fracta (Walker, 1857)
Ctenoplusia limbirena (Guenée, 1852)
Ctenoplusia phocea (Hampson, 1910)
Cyligramma latona (Cramer, 1775)
Diparopsis watersi (Rothschild, 1901)
Drasteria kabylaria (Bang-Haas, 1906)
Drasteria yerburyi (Butler, 1892)
Dysgonia algira (Linnaeus, 1767)
Dysgonia angularis (Boisduval, 1833)
Dysgonia torrida (Guenée, 1852)
Dysmilichia flavonigra (Swinhoe, 1884)
Epharmottomena albiluna (Hampson, 1899)
Epharmottomena sublimbata Berio, 1894
Ericeia congregata (Walker, 1858)
Eublemma anachoresis (Wallengren, 1863)
Eublemma baccalix (Swinhoe, 1886)
Eublemma bifasciata (Moore, 1881)
Eublemma bulla (Swinhoe, 1884)
Eublemma cochylioides (Guenée, 1852)
Eublemma cornutus Fibiger & Hacker, 2004
Eublemma ecthaemata Hampson, 1896
Eublemma gayneri (Rothschild, 1901)
Eublemma khonoides Wiltshire, 1980
Eublemma odontophora Hampson, 1910
Eublemma parva (Hübner, [1808])
Eublemma scitula (Rambur, 1833)
Eublemma seminivea Hampson, 1896
Eublemma subflavipes Hacker & Saldaitis, 2010
Eublemma thermobasis Hampson, 1910
Eublemmoides apicimacula (Mabille, 1880)
Eudocima materna (Linnaeus, 1767)
Eulocastra alfierii Wiltshire, 1948
Eulocastra diaphora (Staudinger, 1878)
Eulocastra insignis (Butler, 1884)
Eutelia amatrix Walker, 1858
Eutelia bowkeri (Felder & Rogenhofer, 1874)
Eutelia discitriga Walker, 1865
Eutelia polychorda Hampson, 1902
Feliniopsis africana (Schaus & Clements, 1893)
Feliniopsis connivens (Felder & Rogenhofer, 1874)
Feliniopsis consummata (Walker, 1857)
Feliniopsis hosplitoides (Laporte, 1979)
Feliniopsis minnecii (Berio, 1939)
Feliniopsis opposita (Walker, 1865)
Feliniopsis sabaea Hacker & Fibiger, 2001
Feliniopsis talhouki (Wiltshire, 1983)
Feliniopsis viettei Hacker & Fibiger, 2001
Fodina legrainei Hacker & Saldaitis, 2010
Gesonia obeditalis Walker, 1859
Gnamptonyx innexa (Walker, 1858)
Grammodes exclusiva Pagenstecher, 1907
Grammodes stolida (Fabricius, 1775)
Hadjina tyriobaphes Wiltshire, 1983
Helicoverpa armigera (Hübner, [1808])
Helicoverpa assulta (Guenée, 1852)
Heliothis nubigera Herrich-Schäffer, 1851
Heliothis peltigera ([Denis & Schiffermüller], 1775)
Heteropalpia acrosticta (Püngeler, 1904)
Heteropalpia exarata (Mabille, 1890)
Heteropalpia robusta Wiltshire, 1988
Heteropalpia rosacea (Rebel, 1907)
Heteropalpia vetusta (Walker, 1865)
Hiccoda dosaroides Moore, 1882
Hipoepa fractalis (Guenée, 1854)
Honeyia clearchus (Fawcett, 1916)
Hypena abyssinialis Guenée, 1854
Hypena laceratalis Walker, 1859
Hypena lividalis (Hübner, 1790)
Hypena obacerralis Walker, [1859]
Hypena obsitalis (Hübner, [1813])
Hypena senialis Guenée, 1854
Hypocala rostrata (Fabricius, 1794)
Hypotacha indecisa Walker, [1858]
Hypotacha isthmigera Wiltshire, 1968
Hypotacha ochribasalis (Hampson, 1896)
Hypotacha raffaldii Berio, 1939
Iambiodes incerta (Rothschild, 1913)
Iambiodes postpallida Wiltshire, 1977
Idia fumosa (Hampson, 1896)
Leucania loreyi (Duponchel, 1827)
Lophoptera arabica Hacker & Fibiger, 2006
Lyncestoides kruegeri (Hacker & Fibiger, 2006)
Lyncestoides unilinea (Swinhoe, 1885)
Marathyssa cuneata (Saalmüller, 1891)
Matopo socotrensis Hacker & Saldaitis, 2010
Maxera marchalii (Boisduval, 1833)
Maxera nigriceps (Walker, 1858)
Melanephia nigrescens (Wallengren, 1856)
Metachrostis quinaria (Moore, 1881)
Metachrostis subvelox Hacker & Saldaitis, 2010
Metopoceras kneuckeri (Rebel, 1903)
Mocis frugalis (Fabricius, 1775)
Mocis mayeri (Boisduval, 1833)
Mocis proverai Zilli, 2000
Mocis repanda (Fabricius, 1794)
Mythimna diopis (Hampson, 1905)
Mythimna languida (Walker, 1858)
Mythimna sokotrensis Hreblay, 1996
Mythimna umbrigera (Saalmüller, 1891)
Mythimna unipuncta (Haworth, 1809)
Nagia natalensis (Hampson, 1902)
Nimasia brachyura Wiltshire, 1982
Ophiusa dianaris (Guenée, 1852)
Ophiusa mejanesi (Guenée, 1852)
Ophiusa tirhaca (Cramer, 1777)
Oraesia emarginata (Fabricius, 1794)
Oraesia intrusa (Krüger, 1939)
Oraesia isolata Hacker & Saldaitis, 2010
Ozarba atrifera Hampson, 1910
Ozarba nyanza (Felder & Rogenhofer, 1874)
Ozarba perplexa Saalmüller, 1891
Ozarba simplex (Rebel, 1907)
Ozarba socotrana Hampson, 1910
Ozarba terminipuncta (Hampson, 1899)
Ozarba varia (Walker, 1865)
Pandesma quenavadi Guenée, 1852
Pandesma robusta (Walker, 1858)
Pericyma mendax (Walker, 1858)
Pericyma metaleuca Hampson, 1913
Phytometra subflavalis (Walker, 1865)
Plecoptera butkevicii Hacker & Saldaitis, 2010
Plusiopalpa dichora Holland, 1894
Polydesma umbricola Boisduval, 1833
Polytela cliens (Felder & Rogenhofer, 1874)
Prionofrontia ochrosia Hampson, 1926
Pseudomicrodes decolor Rebel, 1907
Pseudozarba mesozona (Hampson, 1896)
Rhabdophera clathrum (Guenée, 1852)
Rhesala moestalis (Walker, 1866)
Rhynchina albiscripta Hampson, 1916
Rhynchina coniodes Vári, 1962
Sesamia nonagrioides (Lefèbvre, 1827)
Simplicia extinctalis (Zeller, 1852)
Simplicia robustalis Guenée, 1854
Simyra confusa (Walker, 1856)
Sphingomorpha chlorea (Cramer, 1777)
Spodoptera cilium Guenée, 1852
Spodoptera exempta (Walker, 1857)
Spodoptera exigua (Hübner, 1808)
Spodoptera littoralis (Boisduval, 1833)
Spodoptera mauritia (Boisduval, 1833)
Stenosticta grisea Hampson, 1912
Stenosticta sibensis Wiltshire, 1977
Stenosticta wiltshirei Hacker, Saldaitis & Ivinskis, 2010
Syngrapha circumflexa (Linnaeus, 1767)
Tathorhynchus exsiccata (Lederer, 1855)
Tathorhynchus stenoptera (Rebel, 1907)
Thiacidas cerurodes (Hampson, 1916)
Thiacidas roseotincta (Pinhey, 1962)
Thysanoplusia chalcedona (Hampson, 1902)
Thysanoplusia cupreomicans (Hampson, 1909)
Thysanoplusia exquisita (Felder & Rogenhofer, 1874)
Thysanoplusia rostrata (D. S. Fletcher, 1963)
Thysanoplusia sestertia (Felder & Rogenhofer, 1874)
Thysanoplusia tetrastigma (Hampson, 1910)
Trichoplusia ni (Hübner, [1803])
Trichoplusia orichalcea (Fabricius, 1775)
Trigonodes hyppasia (Cramer, 1779)
Tytroca balnearia (Distant, 1898)
Tytroca leucoptera (Hampson, 1896)
Ulotrichopus stertzi (Püngeler, 1907)
Ulotrichopus tinctipennis (Hampson, 1902)
Vittaplusia vittata (Wallengren, 1856)

Nolidae
Archinola pyralidia Hampson, 1896
Bryophilopsis tarachoides Mabille, 1900
Churia gallagheri Wiltshire, 1985
Earias biplaga Walker, 1866
Earias cupreoviridis (Walker, 1862)
Earias insulana (Boisduval, 1833)
Giaura dakkaki Wiltshire, 1986
Negeta luminosa (Walker, 1858)
Nola pumila Snellen, 1875
Nola socotrensis (Hampson, 1901)
Odontestis murina Wiltshire, 1988
Odontestis socotrensis Hacker & Saldaitis, 2010
Odontestis striata Hampson, 1912
Pardasena minorella Walker, 1866
Pardasena virgulana (Mabille, 1880)
Pardoxia graellsii (Feisthamel, 1837)
Selepa celtis (Moore, 1858)
Xanthodes albago (Fabricius, 1794)
Xanthodes brunnescens (Pinhey, 1968)
Xanthodes gephyrias (Meyrick, 1902)

Notodontidae
Macrosenta purpurascens Hacker, Fibiger & Schreier, 2007

Oecophoridae
Stathmopoda diplaspis (Meyrick, 1887)

Plutellidae
Genostele renigera Walsingham, 1900
Paraxenistis africana Mey, 2007
Plutella xylostella (Linnaeus, 1758)

Pterophoridae
Agdistis adenensis Amsel, 1961
Agdistis arabica Amsel, 1958
Agdistis bellissima Arenberger, 1975
Agdistis cathae Arenberger, 1999
Agdistis hakimah Arenberger, 1985
Agdistis insidiatrix Meyrick, 1933
Agdistis minima Walsingham, 1900
Agdistis nanodes Meyrick, 1906
Agdistis obstinata Meyrick, 1920
Agdistis riftvalleyi Arenberger, 2001
Agdistis tamaricis (Zeller, 1847)
Agdistis tenera Arenberger, 1976
Agdistis tihamae Arenberger, 1999
Agdistis yemenica Arenberger, 1999
Arcoptilia gizan Arenberger, 1985
Deuterocopus socotranus Rebel, 1907
Diacrotricha lanceatus (Arenberger, 1986)
Emmelina monodactyla (Linnaeus, 1758)
Exelastis ebalensis (Rebel, 1907)
Hellinsia bawana Arenberger, 2010
Megalorhipida angusta Arenberger, 2002
Megalorhipida fissa Arenberger, 2002
Megalorhipida leptomeres (Meyrick, 1886)
Megalorhipida leucodactylus (Fabricius, 1794)
Megalorhipida parvula Arenberger, 2010
Merrifieldia malacodactylus (Zeller, 1847)
Platyptilia albifimbriata Arenberger, 2002
Platyptilia dschambiya Arenberger, 1999
Porrittia imbecilla (Meyrick, 1925)
Procapperia hackeri Arenberger, 2002
Pterophorus ischnodactyla (Treitschke, 1833)
Pterophorus rhyparias (Meyrick, 1908)
Puerphorus olbiadactylus (Millière, 1859)
Stangeia siceliota (Zeller, 1847)
Stenodacma wahlbergi (Zeller, 1852)
Stenoptilia amseli Arenberger, 1990
Stenoptilia aridus (Zeller, 1847)
Stenoptilia balsami Arenberger, 2010
Stenoptilia elkefi Arenberger, 1984
Stenoptilia sanaa Arenberger, 1999

Pyralidae
Achroia grisella (Fabricius, 1794)
Ancylosis faustinella (Zeller, 1867)
Ancylosis limoniella (Chrétien, 1911)
Ancylosis nigripunctella (Staudigner, 1879)
Cadra cautella (Walker, 1863)
Candiope erubescens (Hampson, 1896)
Candiope joannisella Ragonot, 1888
Endotricha erythralis Mabille, 1900
Ephestia elutella (Hübner, 1796)
Etiella zinckenella (Treitschke, 1832)
Nephopterix divisella (Duponchel, 1842)
Nephopterix metamelana Hampson, 1896
Nephopterix nigristriata Hampson, 1896
Phycita phoenicocraspis Hampson, 1896
Phycita poteriella Zeller, 1846
Polyocha depressella (Swinhoe, 1885)
Pyralis galactalis Hampson, 1916
Pyralis obsoletalis Mann, 1864
Raphimetopus ablutella (Zeller, 1839)
Staudingeria proniphea (Hampson, 1896)
Staudingeria suboblitella (Ragonot, 1888)
Staudingeria yerburii (Butler, 1884)

Saturniidae
Yatanga arabica (Rougeot, 1977)
Yatanga smithi (Holland, 1892)

Sesiidae
Crinipus leucozonipus Hampson, 1896

Sphingidae
Acherontia styx (Westwood, 1848)
Agrius convolvuli (Linnaeus, 1758)
Basiothia medea (Fabricius, 1781)
Batocnema cocquerelii (Boisduval, 1875)
Cephonodes hylas (Linnaeus, 1771)
Daphnis nerii (Linnaeus, 1758)
Euchloron megaera (Linnaeus, 1758)
Hippotion celerio (Linnaeus, 1758)
Hippotion rosae (Butler, 1882)
Hippotion socotrensis (Rebel, 1899)
Hyles livornica (Esper, 1780)
Nephele vau (Walker, 1856)
Sphingonaepiopsis nana (Walker, 1856)

Tineidae
Perissomastix taeniaecornis (Walsingham, 1896)
Phthoropoea carpella Walsingham, 1896
Tinea messalina Robinson, 1979
Trichophaga abruptella (Wollaston, 1858)
Trichophaga swinhoei (Butler, 1884)

Tortricidae
Cryptophlebia socotrensis Walsingham, 1900
Dasodis cladographa Diakonoff, 1983

Xyloryctidae
Enolmis jemenensis Bengtsson, 2002
Eretmocera bradleyi Amsel, 1961
Eretmocera jemensis Rebel, 1930
Scythris abyanensis Bengtsson, 2002
Scythris albiangulella Bengtsson, 2002
Scythris albocanella Bengtsson, 2002
Scythris albogrammella Bengtsson, 2002
Scythris amplexella Bengtsson, 2002
Scythris badiella Bengtsson, 2002
Scythris basilicella Bengtsson, 2002
Scythris beccella Bengtsson, 2002
Scythris biacutella Bengtsson, 2002
Scythris bicuspidella Bengtsson, 2002
Scythris bispinella Bengtsson, 2002
Scythris camelella Walsingham, 1907
Scythris canella Bengtsson, 2002
Scythris capnofasciae Bengtsson, 2002
Scythris ceratella Bengtsson, 2002
Scythris cinisella Bengtsson, 2002
Scythris consimilella Bengtsson, 2002
Scythris cucullella Bengtsson, 2002
Scythris cuneatella Bengtsson, 2002
Scythris curvipilella Bengtsson, 2002
Scythris fibigeri Bengtsson, 2002
Scythris fissurella Bengtsson, 1997
Scythris galeatella Bengtsson, 2002
Scythris indigoferivora Bengtsson, 2002
Scythris iterella Bengtsson, 2002
Scythris jemenensis Bengtsson, 2002
Scythris meraula Meyrick, 1916
Scythris nigrogrammella Bengtsson, 2002
Scythris nigropterella Bengtsson, 2002
Scythris nipholecta Meyrick, 1924
Scythris nivicolor Meyrick, 1916
Scythris ochrea Walsingham, 1896
Scythris pangalactis Meyrick, 1933
Scythris paralogella Bengtsson, 2002
Scythris parenthesella Bengtsson, 2002
Scythris pollicella Bengtsson, 2002
Scythris pterosaurella Bengtsson, 2002
Scythris reflectella Bengtsson, 2002
Scythris sanae Bengtsson, 2002
Scythris scyphella Bengtsson, 2002
Scythris sinuosella Bengtsson, 2002
Scythris sordidella Bengtsson, 2002
Scythris strabella Bengtsson, 2002
Scythris subgaleatella Bengtsson, 2002
Scythris subparachalca Bengtsson, 2002
Scythris taizzae Bengtsson, 2002
Scythris tenebrella Bengtsson, 2002
Scythris valgella Bengtsson, 2002
Scythris valvaearcella Bengtsson, 2002

External links

Lists of moths by country
Lists of moths of Asia
Moths

Moths